Abdelkader Morcely (born September 17, 1995) is an Algerian footballer who plays as a goalkeeper for MC El Bayadh in the Algerian Ligue Professionnelle 1.

Career 
In 2018, he joined MC Alger.
In 2019, he joined USM Bel Abbès.

References

External links
 

1995 births
Living people
Algerian footballers
Association football goalkeepers
Olympique de Médéa players
MC Alger players
USM Bel Abbès players
21st-century Algerian people